Sony Xperia E3 is an Android smartphone manufactured by Sony. It was launched to the market on September 3, 2014 in the frame of IFA 2014 like a mobile telephone in the entry to mid-range level, being  the successor of the Sony Xperia E1.

Screen 
Xperia E3 possesses an IPS tactile capacitive screen of 4.5 inches with multi tactile points. Its resolution is 854x480 pixels, with 16 million colours.

Hardware 
Xperia E3 works with Qualcomm Snapdragon 400 MSM8926 of 1,2 GHz quad core SoC (variants D2203, D2206 and D2243), whereas D2202 and D2212 variants run with Qualcomm Snapdragon 400 MSM8226. The phone has an internal memory of 4 GB (1.7 GB accessible for the user) with MicroSD support until 32 GB. It possesses 1 GB of RAM and an Adreno 305 GPU. Its Li-ion battery of 2330 mAh last until two days, and 706 hours being in rest.

Software 
Xperia E3 runs Android 4.4 KitkKat with Timescape UI from Sony. It can execute Android 5.1 Lollipop and Android 6.0 Marshmallow in a non-official way.

Variants 
The Xperia E3 possesses the following variants around the world:

Other specifications 
Xperia E3 possesses a 5.0 megapixel (2560x1920 pixels) camera, which can capture photos and videos in high definition (1080p). Also it possesses Bluetooth v2.1 + EDR with To2DP, GPS Assisted and Wi-Fi IEEE 802.11b/g/n and a frontal camera VGA of 0.3 megapixeles (640 x 480) as well as intercommunication between different devices using NFC technology.

Prizes and distinctions 
The Sony Xperia E3 was awarded with the Network Dot 2015 prize with the category "Best of the Best" along with Xperia Z3, Xperia Z3 Compact, Xperia Z3 Tablet and Xperia T2 Ultra.

Apps by Sony 
Sony has some of the following branded applications:
 Album: typical gallery in where they can see  all the images and videos found in any part of the telephone, scanning them automatically.
 Films: allows seeing all the videos in internal memory, the memory of the telephone and the card SD.
 TrackID™: This application serves to scan the audio that are listening and show details about this.
 WALKMAN: Default music player Sony.

See also 
Sony Xperia M2

References

External links 
 

Android (operating system) devices
Sony smartphones
Discontinued smartphones